John Olenchalk (born November 27, 1955) is a former American football linebacker and center. He played for the Kansas City Chiefs from 1981 to 1982.

References

1955 births
Living people
American football linebackers
American football centers
Stanford Cardinal football players
Kansas City Chiefs players
https://www.cflapedia.com/Players/o/olenchalk_john.htm